The Wadia family is a prominent Parsi Indian family.

Wadia may also refer to:

Companies
 Wadia Ghandy & Company, an Indian law firm
 Wadia Group, an Indian conglomerate
 Wadia Movietone, defunct Indian film production company

People
 Ardaseer Cursetjee (1808–1877)
 Bahman Pestonji Wadia
 Darashaw Nosherwan Wadia (1883–1969)
 Lovji Nusserwanjee Wadia (1702–1774)
 Neville Wadia (1911–1996)
 Dina Wadia (1919–2017)
 Nusli Wadia (born 1944)
 Ness Wadia (born 1970)
 Jehangir Wadia (born 1973)
 Jim Wadia (born 1947)
 Spenta R. Wadia (born 1950), Indian theoretical physicist

Places
 Wadia (village), a village in Gujarat